Renato Caccioppoli (20 January 1904 – 8 May 1959) was an Italian mathematician, known for his contributions to mathematical analysis, including the theory of functions of several complex variables, functional analysis, measure theory.

Life and career
Born in Naples, he was the son of Giuseppe Caccioppoli (1852–1947), a surgeon, and his second wife Sofia Bakunin (1870–1956), daughter of the Russian revolutionary Mikhail Bakunin. After earning his high-school diploma in 1921, he enrolled in the department of engineering to swap to mathematics in November 1923. Immediately after earning his laurea in 1925, he became the assistant of Mauro Picone, who in that year was called to the University of Naples, where he remained until 1932. Picone immediately discovered Caccioppoli's brilliance and pointed him towards research in mathematical analysis. During the following five years, Caccioppoli published about 30 works on topics developed in the complete autonomy provided by a ministerial award for mathematics in 1931, a competition he won at the age of 27 and the chair of algebraic analysis at the University of Padova. In 1934 he returned to Naples to accept the chair in group theory; later he took the chair of superior analysis, and from 1943 onwards, the chair in mathematical analysis.

In 1931 he became a correspondent member of the Academy of Physical and Mathematical Sciences of Naples, becoming an ordinary member in 1938. In 1944 he became an ordinary member of the Accademia Pontaniana, and in 1947 a correspondent member of the Accademia Nazionale dei Lincei, and a national member in 1958. He was also a correspondent member of the Paduan Academy of Sciences, Letters, and Arts. In the years from 1947 to 1957 he directed, together with Carlo Miranda, the journal Giornale di Matematiche, founded by Giuseppe Battaglini. In 1948 he became a member of the editing committee of Annali di Matematica, and starting in 1952 he was also a member of the editing committee of Ricerche di Matematica. In 1953 the Academia dei Lincei bestowed on him the national prize of physical, mathematical, and natural sciences.

He was an excellent pianist, noted as well for his nonconformist temperament. He tried out the vagrant life, and was arrested for begging. In May 1938 he gave a speech against Adolf Hitler and Benito Mussolini, when the latter was visiting Naples. Together with his companion Sara Mancuso, he had the French national anthem played by an orchestra, after which he began to speak against fascism and Nazism in the presence of OVRA agents. He was again arrested, but his aunt, Maria Bakunin, who at the time was a professor of chemistry at the University of Naples, succeeded in having him released by convincing the authorities that her nephew was non compos mentis. Thus Caccioppoli was interned, but he continued his studies in mathematics, and playing the piano.

In his last years, the disappointments of politics and his wife's desertion, together perhaps with the weakening of his mathematical vein, pushed him into alcoholism. His growing instability had sharpened his "strangenesses", to the point that the news of his suicide on May 8, 1959 by a headshot did not surprise those who knew him. He died at his home in Palazzo Cellamare.

Work
His most important works, out of a total of around eighty publications, relate to functional analysis and the calculus of variations. Beginning in 1930 he dedicated himself to the study of differential equations, the first to use a topological-functional approach. Proceeding in this way, in 1931 he extended the Brouwer fixed point theorem, applying the results obtained both from ordinary differential equations and partial differential equations.

In 1932 he introduced the general concept of inversion of functional correspondence, showing that a transformation between two Banach spaces is invertible only if it is locally invertible and if the only convergent sequences are the compact ones.

Between 1933 and 1938 he applied his results to elliptic equations, establishing the majorizing limits for their solutions, generalizing the two-dimensional case of Felix Bernstein. At the same time he studied analytic functions of several complex variables, that is, analytic functions whose domain belongs to the vector space , proving in 1933 the fundamental theorem on normal families of such functions: if a family is normal with respect to every complex variable, it is also normal with respect to the set of the variables. He also proved a logarithmic residue formula for functions of two complex variables in 1949.

In 1935 Caccioppoli proved the analyticity of class  solutions of elliptic equations with analytic coefficients.

The year 1952 saw the publication of his masterwork on the area of a surface and measure theory, the article Measure and integration of dimensionally oriented sets (Misura e integrazione degli insiemi dimensionalmente orientati, Rendiconti dell'Accademia Nazionale dei Lincei, s. VIII, v.12). The article is mainly concerned with the theory of dimensionally oriented sets; that is, an interpretation of surfaces as oriented boundaries of sets in space. Also in this paper, the family of sets approximable by polygonal domains of finite perimeter, known today as Caccioppoli sets or sets of finite perimeter, was introduced and studied.

His last works, produced between 1952 and 1953, deal with a class of pseudoanalytic functions, introduced by him to extend certain properties of analytic functions.

Legacy
In 1992 his tormented personality inspired the plot of a film directed by Mario Martone, The Death of a Neapolitan Mathematician (Morte di un matematico napoletano), in which he was portrayed by Carlo Cecchi.

An asteroid, 9934 Caccioppoli, has been named after him.

Selected publications
  (Volume 1) AND  (Volume 2). His "Selected works", a selection from Caccioppoli's scientific works with a biography and a commentary.

See also
 Contraction principle
 Caccioppoli set
 Weyl's inequality

References

Biographical and general references
This article is based largely on material from the equivalent article on Italian Wikipedia, accessed 4 March 2006, and also on the following biographical works:
. the chapter on Caccioppoli in a book collecting brief biographical sketches and bibliographies of the scientific works produced by the mathematicians who taught at the Parthenope University of Naples during their stay.
. The recollections on him by one of his colleagues and close friend.
. An ample biographical paper on him written by Carlo Sbordone, pupil of Federico Cafifiero.
. A brief obituary, basically announcing the commemoration of his scientific work published in the following issue 4 of the same Bulletin.
. A survey on his research work published in the UMI Bulletin: even if no author is stated,  attributes the article to Gianfranco Cimmino.

References describing his scientific contributions
.  is the opening address of the 1988 academic year of the Società Nazionale di Scienze, Lettere ed Arti in Napoli: it describes the contributions of Caccioppoli, Miranda and Cafiero to real analysis and measure theory during their stay in Naples.
 (reviews of the symposium paper, see below). This paper, is a reprint of the contribution of Paulo de Lucia from the "International Symposium Renato Caccioppoli" held in Napoli on 20–22 September 1989 and describes Caccioppoli's and Cafiero's contributions to the development of Measure Theory. The collection includes other papers detailing Caccioppoli's personality and his research, the introduction to his "Opere scelte" (Selected works), a conference held by Caccioppoli himself and related letters by Carlo Miranda, Giovanni Prodi and Francesco Severi.
. A prize winning monograph where Cafiero first states and proves his convergence theorem.
. A Definitive monograph on integration and measure theory: the treatment of the limiting behavior of the integral of various kind of sequences of measure-related structures (measurable functions, measurable sets, measures and their combinations) is somewhat conclusive.
. The work of Cesari summarizing the theory of surface area, including his own contributions.
.
.

Publications dedicated to him or to his memory
. This is a collection of papers detailing his personality and his research, which includes the introduction to his "Opere scelte" (Selected works), a list of contributions from the "International Symposium Renato Caccioppoli" held in Napoli on September 20–22, 1989, a conference held by Caccioppoli himself and related letters by Carlo Miranda, Giovanni Prodi and Francesco Severi.

External links
 
 : biographical sketch from the Caccioppoli family web site.

1904 births
1959 suicides
Scientists from Naples
20th-century Italian mathematicians
Italian people of Russian descent
Complex analysts
Functional analysts
Measure theorists
Mathematical analysts
PDE theorists
Suicides by firearm in Italy
University of Naples Federico II alumni
Members of the Lincean Academy
Italian atheists
1959 deaths
Italian people of Polish descent
Giornale di matematiche editors